I Street or "I" Street is the ninth of a sequence of alphabetical streets in many cities.
 
It may refer to:
I Street (Washington, D.C.)
I Street Bridge, Sacramento, California
Sacramento Valley Station, on I Street in Sacramento, California, known also as I Street Station
iStreet Giving, an online shopping platform which supports UK charities